Mrs. Wiggs of the Cabbage Patch is a 1942 American comedy-drama film starring Fay Bainter and directed by Ralph Murphy. It was based on the play by Anne Crawford Flexner that premiered on Broadway in 1904, which was in turn adapted from the 1901 novel of the same name by Alice Hegan Rice.

Cast
 Fay Bainter as Mrs. Elvira Wiggs
 Vera Vague as Tabitha Hazy
 Hugh Herbert as Marcus Throckmorton
 Betty Brewer as Asia Wiggs
 Billy Lee as Jimmy Wiggs
 Carolyn Lee as Europena Wiggs
 Carl Switzer as Billy Wiggs
 Mary Thomas as Australia Wiggs
 Janet Beecher as Mrs. Olcott
 Barbara Britton as Lucy Olcott
 Moroni Olsen as Dr. Olcott
 Clem Bevans as Postman	
 Ethel Griffies as Mrs. Graham (uncredited)

Other adaptations
The 1942 version is the fourth film adaptation of the novel. The first film version was released in 1914, starring Blanche Chapman. The second version was released in 1919 and stars Marguerite Clark, while the third version was released in 1934 and stars Pauline Lord.

The book was also adapted into a radio series which aired from 1935 to 1938.

References

External links
 
 

1942 films
1942 comedy-drama films
American comedy-drama films
American black-and-white films
Remakes of American films
Films directed by Ralph Murphy
Films scored by Victor Young
Films based on American novels
Films set in 1901
Paramount Pictures films
Films produced by Sol C. Siegel
Films based on works by Alice Hegan Rice
1940s English-language films
1940s American films